The 1984 Amateur World Series was the 28th Amateur World Series (AWS), an international men's amateur baseball tournament. The tournament was sanctioned by the International Baseball Federation (which titled it the Baseball World Cup as of the 1988 tournament). The tournament took place, for the ninth time, in Cuba, from October 14 to 28, and was won by host Cubaits 17th AWS victory.

There were 13 participating countries, including first-time participant Netherlands Antilles.

Standings

Baseball World Cup
Amateur World Series
Amateur World Series
1984
October 1984 sports events in North America